Waste treatment refers to the activities required to ensure that waste has the least practicable impact on the environment. In many countries various forms of waste treatment are required by law.

Solid waste treatment

The treatment of solid wastes is a key component of waste management. Different forms of solid waste treatment are graded in the waste hierarchy.

Waste water treatment

Agricultural waste water treatment
Agricultural wastewater treatment is treatment and disposal of liquid animal waste, pesticide residues etc. from agriculture.

Industrial wastewater treatment
Industrial wastewater treatment is the treatment of wet wastes from factories, mines, power plants and other commercial facilities.

Sewage treatment
Sewage treatment is the treatment and disposal of human waste. Sewage is produced by all human communities. Treatment in urbanized areas is typically handled by centralized treatment systems. Alternative systems may use composting processes or processes that separate solid materials by settlement and then convert soluble contaminants into biological sludge and into gases such as carbon dioxide or methane.

Radioactive waste treatment

Radioactive waste treatment is the treatment and containment of radioactive waste.

References

Waste management
Waste treatment technology